David Allen Laycock (2 September 1947 – 16 September 2008) was an English professional cricketer. He played for Kent County Cricket Club between 1969 and 1973.

Laycock was born at Woolwich in east London in 1847. He first played for Kent's Second XI in 1966 and went on to make his first-class cricket debut in August 1969 against Leicestershire at Canterbury. After making five appearances for the First XI in 1969, including one in the John Player League, Laycock appeared infrequently for the side in the coming years. He made a total of 10 first-class and five List A appearances for Kent between his debut and his final match in August 1973, playing as a batsman and occasional wicket-keeper in a strong Kent side which won the County Championship in 1970 and one-day trophies in each season between 1972 and 1974.

Despite playing 69 matches for the Second XI, including scoring runs during 1974, Laycock was released by Kent at the endow the 1974 season. He became a postman, although he continued to coach cricket.

Laycock died at Eastbourne in Sussex in September 2008 after a long battle with brain cancer. He was 61.

Notes

References

External links

1947 births
2008 deaths
English cricketers
Kent cricketers
People from Woolwich
Cricketers from Greater London